The 1977 Alan King Tennis Classic was a men's tennis tournament played on outdoor hard courts at the Caesars Palace in Las Vegas, Nevada in the United States that was sanctioned by the ATP. It was the sixth edition of the tournament held from April 25 through May 1, 1977. Jimmy Connors won the singles title for the second time. Connors earned $50,000 first-prize money and a $7,000 new car.

Finals

Singles

 Jimmy Connors defeated  Raúl Ramírez 6–4, 5–7, 6–2
 It was Connors' 3rd singles title of the year and the 56th of his career.

Doubles

 Bob Lutz /  Stan Smith defeated  Bob Hewitt /  Raúl Ramírez 6–3, 3–6, 6–4

References

External links
 ITF tournament details

 
Alan King Tennis Classic
Alan King Tennis Classic
Alan King Tennis Classic
Tennis in Las Vegas